Acupalpus hydropicus is an insect-eating ground beetle of the Acupalpus genus.

References

hydropicus
Beetles described in 1863